Dianna Ley (born 28 August 1984) is a Paralympic swimming competitor from Australia.  She won a bronze medal at the 2000 Sydney Games in the Women's 400 m Freestyle S9 event. She was born on 28 August 1984 in Sydney, New South Wales.

References

Female Paralympic swimmers of Australia
Swimmers at the 2000 Summer Paralympics
Paralympic bronze medalists for Australia
1984 births
Living people
Medalists at the 2000 Summer Paralympics
Paralympic medalists in swimming
Swimmers from Sydney
Australian female freestyle swimmers
Australian female medley swimmers
Medalists at the World Para Swimming Championships
S9-classified Paralympic swimmers
21st-century Australian women